Ayacucho Partido is a partido in Buenos Aires Province, Argentina.

Districts
 Cangallo
 Udaquiola
 Langueyú
 Solanet
 La Constancia
 San Ignacio District
 Fair District

External links

 
 Ministry of the Interior statistics

1865 establishments in Argentina
Partidos of Buenos Aires Province